Haroon Shahid is a Pakistani musician and actor. He is  known for his portrayals in several television serials including Do Bol , Qayamat (TV series), Muqaddar, Amanat (2021 TV series), Hum Kahan Ke Sachay Thay and Aakhir Kab Tak. He made his cinematic debut with Shoaib Mansoor's Verna in 2017. His performance as a selfish lover in romantic drama Do Bol earned him Lux Style Awards nomination for Best Emerging Talent.

Filmography

Film

Television

Awards and nominations

References

External links

Year of birth missing (living people)
Living people
Place of birth missing (living people)
Pakistani musicians
Pakistani male film actors
Pakistani male television actors